Oyo Ollombo Airport  is an airport serving the city of Oyo in Cuvette Department, Republic of the Congo.

The Ollombo non-directional beacon (Ident: OTK) is located on the field.

Airlines and Destinations
As of August 2016, there are currently no scheduled services to and from the airport.

See also

 List of airports in the Republic of the Congo
 Transport in the Republic of the Congo

References

External links
OpenStreetMap - Oyo Ollombo